The Wizard was launched as a weekly British story paper on 22 September 1922, published by  It was merged with The Rover in September 1963, becoming Rover and Wizard. The last issue of the original Wizard was number 1,970; Rover and Wizard continued until the Wizard name was dropped — becoming The Rover in August 1969. 

The Wizard was relaunched as a comic book on 14 February 1970, and continued until 10 June 1978.

Regular features
 Blazing Ace of Spades — fictional RAF fighter pilot of the Second World War
 The Q Team — an association football team assembled by the mysterious Ka
 Ruthless Ruff — fictional RFC flying ace of the Great War
 Wilson the Wonder Athlete — the sporting adventures of a heroic character named William Wilson
 Wolf of Kabul — fictional agent of the British Intelligence Corps on the North-West Frontier Province

References

Sources 
 

DC Thomson Comics titles
British boys' story papers
Comics magazines published in the United Kingdom
Defunct British comics
1922 comics debuts
1963 comics endings
1970 comics debuts
1978 comics endings
Magazines established in 1922
Magazines disestablished in 1963
Magazines established in 1970
Magazines disestablished in 1978
1922 establishments in the United Kingdom
1978 disestablishments in the United Kingdom